Mellow Madness is a 1975 studio album by Quincy Jones. It was Jones's first album recorded since treatment for a cerebral aneurysm. The album introduced the R&B public to The Brothers Johnson, who co-wrote four of the album tracks.

Track listing 
 "Is It Love That We're Missing?" (George Johnson, Debbie Smith) (3:52)
 "Paranoid"  (Joe Green)(2:55)
 "Mellow Madness" (Tom Bahler, Al Ciner, Quincy Jones, Paulette McWilliams) (3:27)
 "Beautiful Black Girl" (Jones, Otis Smith) (6:12)
 "Listen (What It Is)" (Quincy Jones, George Johnson, Louis Johnson) (4:16)
 "Just a Little Taste of Me" ( Henry George Johnson, Louis Johnson )(3:28)
 "My Cherie Amour" (Henry Cosby, Sylvia Moy, Stevie Wonder) (5:25)
 "Tryin' to Find Out About You" ( Henry George Johnson, Louis Johnson )(3:02)
 "Cry Baby" (Quincy Jones)(4:29)
 "Bluesette" (Norman Gimbel, Toots Thielemans) (7:01)

Personnel

Performance 
 Quincy Jones - Arranger, Composer, Keyboards, Producer, Trumpet, Vocals, Background vocals
 Toots Thielemans - Guitar, Harmonica, Whistler
 Dave Grusin, Don Grusin, Mike Melvoin, Jerry Peters - Keyboards
 Ian Underwood - Synthesizer
 Louis Johnson, Max Bennett, Chuck Rainey - Bass
 Grady Tate, Harvey Mason - Drums
 Wah Wah Watson, George Johnson, Dennis Budimir - Guitar
 Ralph MacDonald - Conga Drums, Percussion
 Hubert Laws - Flute
 Tommy Morgan - Harmonica
 Ernie Krivda, Sahib Shihab - Saxophone
 Bill Lamb, Chuck Findley, Tom Bahler - Trumpet
 Frank Rosolino - Trombone, Trumpet
 George Bohanon - Trombone
 Jerome Richardson - Wind
 Minnie Riperton, Leon Ware, Jesse Kirkland, Myrna Matthews, Paulette McWilliams, Joseph Greene, Jim Gilstrap, Carolyn Willis, Watts Prophets, George Johnson - Vocals

Charts

Singles

References 

1975 albums
Quincy Jones albums
Albums arranged by Quincy Jones
Albums produced by Quincy Jones
A&M Records albums